Mark C. Udey is an American biologist, focusing in epidermal Langerhans cells, dendritic cells, EpCAM (epithelial cell adhesion molecule), distal-less and skin immunology, currently at National Cancer Institute and an Elected Fellow of the American Association for the Advancement of Science. Udey is a professor of dermatology at Washington University School of Medicine, where he was also an graduate of the medical scientist training program.

References

Year of birth missing (living people)
Living people
Fellows of the American Association for the Advancement of Science
21st-century American biologists
Place of birth missing (living people)
Washington University School of Medicine alumni
Washington University School of Medicine faculty